Edvīns Bietags (28 February 1908, in Rūjiena – 29 September 1983, in Jūrmala) was a Latvian wrestler and Olympic medalist.

Edvīns competed at the 1936 Summer Olympics in Berlin, Germany, and won a silver medal in Greco-Roman Light Heavyweight wrestling.

External links
 
 
 
 

1908 births
1983 deaths
People from Rūjiena
Olympic wrestlers of Latvia
Wrestlers at the 1936 Summer Olympics
Latvian male sport wrestlers
Olympic silver medalists for Latvia
Olympic medalists in wrestling
Medalists at the 1936 Summer Olympics
European Wrestling Championships medalists
20th-century Latvian people